Ashkashla (Aşqaşlı) is a rural locality (a village) in Ilyino-Polyansky Selsoviet, Blagoveshchensky District, Bashkortostan, Russia. The population was 28 as of 2010. There is 1 street.

Geography 
Ashkashla is located 24 km southeast of Blagoveshchensk (the district's administrative centre) by road. Rozhdestvenskoye and Kryukovsky are the nearest rural localities.

References 

Rural localities in Blagoveshchensky District